Musang or musang sentheni may refer to:

 7.62×37mm Musang, a Filipino rifle cartridge
 Anicca, the concept of impermanence in Buddhism
 Gua Musang, a town and territory in Kelantan, Malaysia
 musang, the Asian palm civet in the Tagalog, Malaysian and Indonesian languages
 Musang Berjanggut, Malaysian film